R v Secretary of State for the Home Department, ex parte Venables and Thompson [1997] UKHL 25 is a UK constitutional law case, concerning the exercise of independent judgement in judicial review.

Facts
Venables and Thompson claimed that the Home Secretary had unlawfully decided not to release them from prison, after they were convicted of murder as children. The Home Secretary took into account public petitions demanding the murderer be imprisoned for life. He refused to take account of their progress and development during detention. He increased the ‘tariff period’ from 10-15 years to delay release, and said they should be dealt with on the same basis as adult offenders, where mandatory life sentences were imposed.

Judgment
The House of Lords held by 3 to 2, that the Home Secretary acted unlawfully by taking into account irrelevant considerations (a public petition) and failing to take into account relevant considerations (progress in detention).

Lord Steyn said the following of the Home Secretary.

See also
Anthony Anderson (murderer), who successfully challenged the Home Secretary's power to set minimum terms for sentences of life imprisonment
United Kingdom constitutional law

Notes

References

United Kingdom constitutional case law
United Kingdom enterprise case law